Raqsh is Kuwait's first modern youth initiative based in Kuwait, recognized by UNESCO Kuwait. The organization specializes in book collection via devices placed in strategic location. So far they have impacted 4.3% of Jordan's refugee population. Raqsh was established during The Proteges program by the fifth generation.

Meaning of "Raqsh"
The word "Raqsh", "رقش" is an Arabic word for beautiful typography.

Mission
To combat the lack of education due to the absence of books, and to promote the importance of books by donating them to the less fortunate.

Method
Providing books for the underprivileged by collecting books through devices placed in selected locations such as KIPCO tower and Elevation Burger Kuwait; then sending the books to impact a small scale society.

Devices
The device can hold approximately 1,500 books. So far the devices have been placed in four locations. Elevation burger has a custom made device.

Impact
The Raqsh team carried out three trips to Jordan and one trip to Goa India. Over 100,000 individuals have been impacted in camps around Jordan such as Al-Zaatari camp. The team has been asked to expand to Saudi Arabia, the United States and Pakistan.

References

External links
http://theproteges.org/alumini.html
http://bazaar.town/the-proteges-building-generations/
http://www.alanba.com.kw/ar/kuwait-news/599689/07-11-2015-البحر-رقش-تبرع-بـ-10-آلاف-كتاب-لأطفال-المخيمات-في-الأردن/
http://www.aljarida.com/news/index/2012780486/الضاحي--مبادرة-«رقش»-غايتها-توفير-الكتب-للمحتاجين
http://www.alraimedia.com/ar/article/video/2015/11/12/634868/nr/nc
http://www.arabtimesonline.com/wp-content/uploads/pdf/2016/jan/13/03.pdf
http://news.kuwaittimes.net/pdf/2015/jul/06/p06.pdf
https://issuu.com/bazaarmagazine/docs/issuu_november
http://csr.kipco.com/?p=404

Youth organizations based in Kuwait